S.B. Ballard Stadium, formerly Foreman Field, is a 21,944-seat multi-purpose stadium on the campus of Old Dominion University in Norfolk, Virginia. It opened in 1936 with a football game between the University of Virginia and the College of William & Mary's Norfolk Division, which is now Old Dominion University. It is currently the home of Old Dominion Monarchs football.

History

The stadium was built as the home of the first Old Dominion football program when the university was still known as the Norfolk Division of the College of William & Mary. The stadium was home to the football program from 1936 until it was discontinued in 1941. After the demise of the football program, Foreman Field hosted a number of other events. It was the site of the annual Oyster Bowl game from 1946 to 1995, featuring major college football teams in its early decades. Syracuse defeated Navy there in 1959 on its way to winning the national championship. Future NFL stars Fran Tarkenton, Roger Staubach, and Don Meredith played in Oyster Bowl games. It was also the home of the minor pro Norfolk Neptunes in the 1960s and 1970s, and the Washington Redskins played several pre-season games there in the 1960s. Over the years Foreman Field was used for several high-profile concerts including Crosby, Stills, Nash & Young's 1974 reunion tour, more than 33,000 people were in attendance.

The Virginia Ambassadors of the World Football League were to play their games at Foreman Field in 1974 before the franchise was sold and moved to Orlando. The Shreveport Pirates of the Canadian Football League almost moved there for the 1996 season before the franchise folded. The United Football League's Virginia Destroyers likewise considered Foreman Field as a potential location before instead choosing the Virginia Beach Sportsplex. A drawing of Foreman Field is featured in the John Grisham novel Bleachers.

Beginning in 1971, Foreman Field served as the home stadium for the Monarchs Field Hockey team, which used the facility until 2007. Forman Field was also home to the Norfolk State Spartans football program from Norfolk State University, also located in Norfolk, throughout the 1980s and 1990s until completion of Norfolk State's 30,000 seat William "Dick" Price Stadium in 1997.

Renovations

The stadium underwent a $24.8 million renovation in preparation for the start of the 2009 I-AA season. In July 2009, the stadium was renamed Foreman Field at S.B. Ballard Stadium, in honor of a local contractor, who donated more than $2.5 million for the stadium. On September 5, 2009, the first ODU football game was held at Foreman Field. Old Dominion defeated Chowan University 36–21.

In 2016, Populous did an expansion study and recommended that Foreman Field be torn down and rebuilt because the existing structure could not be updated to meet modern building codes. Old Dominion University endorsed the study findings and the plan to renovate the stadium was approved by the Virginia General Assembly in 2017. Phase I of the stadium renovation will be completed between the 2018 and 2019 football seasons. The capacity after the completion of Phase I will 22,130. The capacity after Phase II will be over 30,000.

Old Dominion played their final game in Foreman Field's original form on November 17, 2018 against Virginia Military Institute. The $67.5 million stadium reconstruction project began with the demolition of the old grandstands on November 19, 2018 and is expected to be completed in time for Old Dominion's 2019 season.

Greg DuBois, ODU's vice president for administration and finance, said the University "looked at other projects done around the country in this fashion, and we worked with the architects and contractors to assure ourselves we could do it in nine months.

"It will be a tremendous challenge, but we're confident it can and will be done on time."

On January 28, 2019, ODU officials voted to rename the playing surface after alumnus Barry Kornblau after his $3 million donation. The official capacity for S.B. Ballard Stadium during the 2019 season is 22,480.

Largest attendance

Gallery

See also
 List of NCAA Division I FBS football stadiums

References

External links

Foreman Field Football Complex

College field hockey venues in the United States
College football venues
Old Dominion Monarchs football
Old Dominion University
Sports venues in Norfolk, Virginia
Multi-purpose stadiums in the United States
Sports venues completed in 1936
1936 establishments in Virginia